Kittikai Juntaraksa (born 7 April 1996) is a Thai professional footballer who plays as a midfielder for Samut Prakan City.

International career
Kittikai was part of Thailand U19's squad in the 2014 Hassanal Bolkiah Trophy.

References

External links

1996 births
Living people
Kittikai Juntaraksa
Kittikai Juntaraksa
Kittikai Juntaraksa
Association football midfielders
Kittikai Juntaraksa
Kittikai Juntaraksa